
Gmina Rzgów is an urban-rural gmina (administrative district) in Łódź East County, Łódź Voivodeship, in central Poland.

Villages
Apart from the town of Rzgów, Gmina Rzgów contains the villages and settlements of Babichy, Bronisin Dworski, Czyżeminek, Gospodarz, Grodzisko, Guzew, Huta Wiskicka, Kalinko, Kalino, Konstantyna, Prawda, Romanów, Stara Gadka, Starowa Góra and Tadzin.

Neighbouring gminas
Gmina Rzgów is bordered by the city of Łódź and by the gminas of Brójce, Ksawerów, Pabianice and Tuszyn.

References
Polish official population figures 2006

Rzgow
Łódź East County